"Avanti ragazzi di Buda" is an Italian anti-communist song written by Pier Francesco Pingitore and composed by Dimitri Gribanovski. It commemorates the Hungarian Revolution of 1956 and is a widespread and well-known song in Italy, having some presence in Hungary as well.

History
"Avanti ragazzi di Buda" was written by Pier Francesco Pingitore in October 1966 to commemorate of the tenth anniversary of the Hungarian Revolution of 1956 and in response, according to him, to the "institutional silence on the event". Dimitri Gribanovski composed a song for Pingitore's work and it was initially interpreted by Pino Caruso. The song immediately enjoyed great success within the newborn il Bagaglino, later spreading among Roman universities.

Its first recording dates back to 1984, done by the Youth Front of Trieste.

Success and diffusion
In September 2019, the Hungarian Prime Minister Viktor Orbán, who was then a guest of a demonstration of the political party Brothers of Italy, defined the song as "the most beautiful one ever composed about the 1956 revolution".

The song is also often sung as a football chant by ultras of the S.S. Lazio football team.

See also
Hungary–Italy relations

References

External links

1966 songs
Italian patriotic songs
Hungarian patriotic songs
Italian-language songs
Italian folk songs
Hungarian Revolution of 1956
Anti-communism
Protest songs